Amblyseius euvertex is a species of mite in the family Phytoseiidae.

References

euvertex
Articles created by Qbugbot
Animals described in 1983
Taxa named by Wolfgang Karg